Duchess of Wellington is the title given to the wife of the Duke of Wellington. Women who have held the title include:

Catherine Wellesley, Duchess of Wellington (1773-1831)
Elizabeth Wellesley, Duchess of Wellington (1820-1904) 
Dorothy Wellesley, Duchess of Wellington (1889-1956)
Diana Wellesley, Duchess of Wellington (1922-2010)
Princess Antonia, Duchess of Wellington (born 1955), current holder of the title

In popular culture:

The 2009 Filipino comedy film Yaya and Angelina: The Spoiled Brat Movie featured a fictionalized (and unnamed) Duchess of Wellington, who was the subject of a terrorist plot in the movie. The duchess was portrayed by Michael V., who also portrayed one of the titular characters, Rosalinda "Yaya" Lucero.